Andrew James Jones (born 30 November 1977) is a former English cricketer.  Jones was a right-handed batsman who bowled right-arm fast-medium.  He was born in Stoke-on-Trent, Staffordshire.

Jones made his debut for Staffordshire in the 1998 Minor Counties Championship against Cumberland.  Jones played Minor counties cricket for Staffordshire from 1998 to 2002, which included 15 Minor Counties Championship matches and 2 MCCA Knockout Trophy matches. In 2000, he made his only List A appearance against Devon in the NatWest Trophy. In this match, he took the wickets of David Lye and Ian Gompertz.  He did bat in the match, but ended unbeaten without scoring any runs.

References

External links
Andrew Jones at ESPNcricinfo
Andrew Jones at CricketArchive

1977 births
Living people
Cricketers from Stoke-on-Trent
English cricketers
Staffordshire cricketers